Thayer is a village in Sangamon County, Illinois, United States. The population was 693 at the 2010 census. It is part of the Springfield, Illinois Metropolitan Statistical Area.

Geography
Thayer is located at  (39.539071, -89.761008).

Demographics

As of the census of 2000, there were 750 people, 276 households, and 203 families residing in the village. The racial makeup of the village was 99.07% White, 0.13% African American, 0.53% from other races, and 0.27% from two or more races. Hispanic or Latino of any race were 0.80% of the population.

There were 276 households, out of which 38.4% had children under the age of 18 living with them, 63.4% were married couples living together, 8.3% had a female householder with no husband present, and 26.1% were non-families. 21.4% of all households were made up of individuals, and 10.9% had someone living alone who was 65 years of age or older. The average household size was 2.72 and the average family size was 3.18.

In the village, the population was spread out, with 29.7% under the age of 18, 8.4% from 18 to 24, 30.7% from 25 to 44, 18.4% from 45 to 64, and 12.8% who were 65 years of age or older. The median age was 33 years. For every 100 females, there were 104.9 males. For every 100 females age 18 and over, there were 97.4 males.

The median income for a household in the village was $42,031, and the median income for a family was $51,750. Males had a median income of $32,750 versus $24,904 for females. The per capita income for the village was $20,933. About 4.1% of families and 5.1% of the population were below the poverty line, including 1.0% of those under age 18 and 13.8% of those age 65 or over.

Notable people 
 Andrew F. Warga, member of the Wisconsin State Assembly elected in 1958

References

Villages in Sangamon County, Illinois
Villages in Illinois
Springfield metropolitan area, Illinois